Ulemjiin Chanar (in , meaning "quality of greatness") is a Mongolian folk song composed by Danzanravjaa at his meditation center in the Gobi Desert. The song praises the beauty of a Mongolian woman and is one of the most well known and popular folk songs in Mongolia. Because of its spiritual qualities, singing the song with all one's heart is believed to produce merit equivalent to reciting ten thousand Tara Ekh tantric prayers. Renowned Mongolian singer Norovbanzad's rendering of the song  is well known, among many other modern interpretations. The song has been made into a theater drama play and drama movie a number of times throughout the 20th century as well as a musical in 2008.

Original lyrics by Danzanravjaa 

Үлэмжийн чанар төгөлдөр
Өнгө тунамал толь шиг
Үзэсгэлэнт царайг чинь
Үзвэл лагшин төгс маань
Үнэхээр сэтгэлийг булаанам зээ

Хөшүүн сэтгэлийг уяруулагч
Хөхөө шувууны эгшиг шиг
Хөөрхөн эелдэг үг чинь
Хүүрнэн суухад урамтай
Хөөрхөн ааль мину зээ

Учирмагц сэнгэнэсэн
Уран гол шиг бие чинь
Угаас хамт бүтсэн
Улаан занданы үнэр шиг
Улмаар сэтгэлийг хөдөлгөнө зээ

Бадмын дундаас дэвэрсэн
Балын амт адил
Баясгалант ааль чинь
Бахдаж ханашгүй
Баярыг улам арвитгана зээ

References 
 

Mongolian songs
19th-century songs
Year of song unknown
Songwriter unknown